The 1948 New Hampshire Wildcats football team was an American football team that represented the University of New Hampshire as a member of the Yankee Conference during the 1948 college football season. In its third year under head coach Bill Glassford, the team compiled a 5–3 record (3–1 against conference opponents), outscoring opponents 155–103. The team played its home games at Lewis Field (also known as Lewis Stadium) in Durham, New Hampshire.

This was the first year that the rivalry game between New Hampshire and Maine saw a musket presented to the winning team—the musket was "donated by Portland alumni of the two institutions". The "Battle for the Brice-Cowell Musket" takes its name from former head coaches of the two programs; Fred Brice who coached at Maine (1921–1940) and Butch Cowell who coached at New Hampshire (1915–1936).

Schedule

References

New Hampshire
New Hampshire Wildcats football seasons
Yankee Conference football champion seasons
New Hampshire Wildcats football